Zeta Persei (ζ Per, ζ Persei) is a star in the northern constellation of Perseus. With an apparent visual magnitude of 2.9, it can be readily seen with the naked eye.

Description
This is a lower luminosity supergiant star with a stellar classification of B1 Ib. This is an enormous star, with an estimated 26–27 times the Sun's radius and 13–16 times the Sun's mass. It has about 47,000 times the luminosity of the Sun and it is radiating this energy at an effective temperature of 20,800 K, giving it the blue-white hue of a B-type star. The spectrum displays anomalously high levels of carbon. Zeta Persei has a strong stellar wind that is expelling  times the mass of the Sun per year, or the equivalent of the Sun's mass every 4.3 million years.

Zeta Persei has a 9th magnitude companion at an angular separation of 12.9 arcseconds. The two stars have the same proper motion, so they may be physically associated. If so, they are separated by at least 4,000 Astronomical Units. Zeta Persei is a confirmed member of the Perseus OB2 association (Per OB2), also called the Zeta Persei association, which is a moving group of stars that includes 17 massive, high luminosity members with spectral types of O or B, giving them a blue hue. These stars have a similar trajectory through space, suggesting they originated in the same molecular cloud and are about the same age.

Ambiguity
Some sources, including Starry Night (planetarium software), an atlas,  and a web site attribute the name 'Atik' to Zeta Persei instead of nearby Omicron Persei.

See also
 HD 121228 - Same spectral class

References

External links

Persei, Zeta
Perseus (constellation)
B-type supergiants
Atik
Persei, 44
018246
1203
024398
Durchmusterung objects